iPhone Touch is a mistaken reference to one of two touchscreen devices by Apple Inc.:
the iPhone, which has cell phone features, or
the iPod Touch, which does not.